Thierry Grégoire (Charleville-Mézières) is a French countertenor.

Biography

Gregoire studied at the Ecole Nationale De Musique - Charleville Mezieres, where he won 1st Prize in the class of Mme Josette Barreaud. He also studied under James Bowman, Paul Esswood, Henri Ledroit, Margreet Honig and Hubert Weller. At the suggestion of Henri Ledroit he auditioned as a singer in Le Bourgeois Gentilhomme by Molière and Lully at Comédie Francaise. He went on to sing in over 350 performances of the work. He then came to the attention of conductors such as Jean-Claude Malgoire, Christophe Rousset, Jonathan Darlington, and Marc Minkowski. Under Minkowski he has sung the title role in Alessandro Stradella's oratorio San Giovanni Battista, performed in Handel's Dixit Dominus and Monteverdi's L'incoronazione di Poppea as well as singing the role of Coryphée in Minkowski's 1999 recording of Gluck's Armide.

Amongst the music festivals where he has appeared are the Aix-en-Provence Festival, Festival de Beaune, Festival d'Ile de France (Paris), Festival d’Art Sacré de la Ville de Paris, and the Wiener Festwochen (Vienna).
He also appeared on the international stage in productions in New York City, Vienna, Amsterdam, Tokyo, Paris as well as in concerts in Europe, Morocco, India, and Australia.

In 2003 he appeared in a series of recitals in Europe with the mezzo-soprano Magdalena Kožená.  In March 2004, the French music magazine Classica featured him as a Classica RTL young talent and included the RTL Discoveries CD Thierry Gregoire chante Vivaldi et Haendel. Since 2005 Gregoire has also been a voice teacher at Ecole Nationale De Musique - Charleville Mezieres.

Awards
 1998 Prize winner - International Competition "Giovan Battista Velluti" - New Voices for Opera 
 2001 Czech Crystal Award, Golden Prague International Television Festival - Best recording of a concert or stage performance (opera, operetta, ballet, dance, musical), Magdalena Kožená and Thierry Gregoire Česká televize, Brno Television Studio, Czech Republic

Quotes
 "Thierry Gregoire has a rich, deep and moving mezzo voice " - Le Monde de la musique 
 "Thierry Gregoire has the ideal voice for Ottone" - Sergio Segalini, musicologist and former Artistic Director of La Fenice

Discography 
 CD
 Monteverdi - Orfeo (Pastore) - Conductor: Jean-Claude Malgoire
 Haendel - Agrippina (Ottone) - Conductor: Jean-Claude Malgoire
 Vivaldi - Tito Manlio (Decio) - Conductor: Federico Maria Sardelli
 Vivaldi - Orlando Furioso (Ruggiero) - Conductor: Federico Maria Sardelli
 Gluck - Armide Conductor: Marc Minkowski
 Lully - Acis et Galatée - Conductor: Marc Minkowski
 Cavalli - Requiem - Conductor: Françoise Lasserre
 Palestrina - Madrigaux - Conductor: Françoise Lasserre
 Cavanna - Raphael, reviens!
 DVD
 Monteverdi - Incoronazione di Poppea - Conductor: Marc Minkowski, (Aix-en-Provence Festival)
 Handel - Agrippina (Ottone) - Conductor: Jean-Claude Malgoire
 Monteverdi - Orfeo (Pastore) - Conductor: Jean-Claude Malgoire

References

Biography: Thierry Gregoire Gabriele Monici Artist Management. Accessed 6 December 2008.

External links 
Thierry Grégoire - official web site 

Living people
Year of birth missing (living people)
People from Charleville-Mézières
Operatic countertenors
21st-century French male opera singers
Voice teachers